Savoy Records is an American record company and label established by Herman Lubinsky in 1942 in Newark, New Jersey. Savoy specialized in jazz, rhythm and blues, and gospel music.

In September 2017, Savoy was acquired by Concord Bicycle Music.

History
In the 1940s, Savoy recorded some of the biggest names in jazz: Charlie Parker, Erroll Garner, Dexter Gordon, J. J. Johnson, Fats Navarro, and Miles Davis. In 1948, it began buying other labels: Bop, Discovery, National, and Regent. It also reissued music from Jewel Records.

In the early 1960s, Savoy briefly recorded several avant-garde jazz artists. These included Paul Bley, Ed Curran, Bill Dixon, Mark Levin, Charles Moffett, Perry Robinson, Joseph Scianni, Archie Shepp, Sun Ra, Marzette Watts, and Valdo Williams.

After Lubinsky's death in 1974, Clive Davis, then manager of Arista Records, acquired Savoy's catalogue. After that, Joe Fields of Muse Records purchased the catalogue from Arista. In 1986, Malaco Records acquired Savoy's black gospel titles and contracts. In 1991, Nippon Columbia acquired Savoy and its library, and distributed Savoy releases through its wholly owned subsidiary, Savoy Jazz. In 2003, Savoy Jazz acquired the rights to the Muse and Landmark catalogues from 32 Jazz. In 2009, the label entered a distribution arrangement with Warner Music Group. Savoy included the rock imprint 429 Records.

Many of the label's African American artists begrudged the label's founder, Herman Lubinsky, feeling underpaid for their work. Tiny Price, a journalist for the African American newspaper The Newark Herald News, said of Savoy and Lubinsky:
There's no doubt everybody hated Herman Lubinsky. If he messed with you, you were messed. At the same time, some of those people, many of them Newark's top singers and musicians, would never have been exposed on records if he didn't do what he did. Except for Lubinsky, all the hot little numbers, like Buddy Johnson's "Cherry", would have been lost. The man may have been hated, but he saved a lot of our history for us and for future generations.

Savoy's artistic directors included Buck Ram, Teddy Reig, Ralph Bass (1948–1952), Fred Mendelsohn (1953), and Ozzie Cadena (1954–1962).

Discography
The following are 12" LPs and have the prefix MG.

Subsidiaries
 Acorn Records (1949‒51)
 Gospel Records (1958–early 1970s)
 Regent Records (1947‒64)
 Sharp Records (1960‒64)

See also
 List of record labels

References

Further reading

External links
 Official website
 SavoyJazz.com
 Savoy Records Discography Project
 Savoy Records on the Internet Archive's Great 78 Project

American record labels
American jazz record labels
Record labels established in 1942
Culture of Newark, New Jersey
1942 establishments in New Jersey
American companies established in 1942
Companies based in Newark, New Jersey